A dispute exists over the international name for the body of water which is bordered by Japan, Korea (North and South) and Russia. In 1992, objections to the name Sea of Japan were first raised by North Korea and South Korea at the Sixth United Nations Conference on the Standardization of Geographical Names. The Japanese government supports the exclusive use of the name "Sea of Japan" (日本海), while South Korea supports the alternative name "East Sea", and North Korea supports the name "Korean East Sea".  Currently, most international maps and documents use either the name Sea of Japan (or equivalent translation) by itself, or include both the name Sea of Japan and East Sea, often with East Sea listed in parentheses or otherwise marked as a secondary name.  The International Hydrographic Organization, the governing body for the naming of bodies of water around the world, in 2012 decided it was still unable to revise the 1953 version of its publication S-23 – Limits of Oceans and Seas, which includes only the single name "Sea of Japan", to include "East Sea" together with "Sea of Japan".

The involved countries (especially Japan and South Korea) have advanced a variety of arguments to support their preferred name(s).  Many of the arguments revolve around determining when the name Sea of Japan became the common name.  South Korea argues that historically the more common name was East Sea, Sea of Korea, or another similar variant.  South Korea further argues that the name Sea of Japan did not become common until Korea was under Japanese rule, at which time it had no ability to influence international affairs.  Japan argues that the name Sea of Japan has been the most common international name since at least the beginning of the 19th century, long before its annexation of Korea.  Both sides have conducted studies of antiquarian maps, but the two countries have produced divergent research results.  Additional arguments have been raised regarding the underlying geography of the sea as well as potential problems regarding the ambiguity of one name or the other.

Arguments

Both sides in the dispute have put forward a number of arguments to support their claims.

Arguments based on historical maps

Arguments from North Korea
North Korea favors the exclusive use of the more nationalistic "Korean East Sea" or "East Sea of Korea" (조선동해/朝鮮東海) There are currently as of 2019 no known published maps on behalf of the North Korean government to assert their claims on the nomenclature "Korean East Sea" or "East Sea of Korea". No American, European, Chinese, or Japanese academic scholarship has been able to independently verify the North Koreans' nomenclature claims, nor has the IHO committee considered North Korea's request seriously.

Arguments from South Korea
According to the Ministry of Foreign Affairs for South Korea, the name Donghae (동해, literally East Sea) has been used in Korea for over 2,000 years, including in History of the Three Kingdoms (三國史記, 1145), the monument of King Gwanggaeto, and "Map of Eight Provinces of Korea" (八道總圖, 1530). The first documented map to name the area the Sea of Japan was the world map drawn by the Italian missionary Matteo Ricci in China (1602) named Kunyu Wanguo Quantu (坤輿萬國全圖).  No Japanese record published up to the late-18th century indicated any name for the body of water. Furthermore, South Korea has pointed out that a few 19th-century Japanese maps referred to the sea as Chōsenkai (朝鮮海, literally Sea of Joseon), including the "Simplified Map of Japan's Periphery" (日本邊界略圖, 1809) and "New World Map" (新製輿地全圖, 1844). South Korea argues there was no standard name prior to Japan's military expansion in the region in the late 19th and early 20th centuries.  Additionally, it specifically states that the name Sea of Japan was not widely used, even in Japan, as late as the mid 19th century. Thus, South Korea argues that the current name reflects active promotion by Japan during a time when Korea could not represent its interests internationally. In 1992, the name "East Sea" was agreed upon in South Korea and claimed by the country for the sea during its participation in the U.N. Conference on Standardization of Geographical Names.

Arguments from Japan
The Japanese government claims that the name Sea of Japan was internationally used since the 17th century and established by the early 19th century, during a period in which Japan was under an isolationist policy (Sakoku) of the Tokugawa shogunate, which restricted cultural exchange and commerce with foreign countries except China and the Netherlands until 1854. Accordingly, they state, Japan could not have, at that time, had an influence on the international community regarding the naming of the sea.

The invention of the marine chronometer in the late 18th century enabled Western explorers, such as Jean-François de Galaup from France, William Robert Broughton from Britain, and Adam Johann von Krusenstern (Ivan Fyodorovich Kruzenshtern) from Russia, to measure time and longitudes on the sea precisely and map the detailed shape of the Sea of Japan. Krusenstern was an admiral and explorer, who led the first Russian circumnavigation of the globe. According to Japanese records, it was Krusenstern who popularized the name "Mer du Japon" (Sea of Japan) in the West. In his work "Reise um die Welt in den Jahren" (1812), he wrote, "People also call this sea area the Sea of Korea, but because only a small part of this sea touches the Korean coast, it is better to name it the Sea of Japan." The original book was published in St. Petersburg in German and Russian, translated into Dutch, French, Swedish, Italian and English, and distributed widely among Europe. As a result, the international name of the sea changed from no name to the Sea of Japan, on the maps drawn by countries other than Japan or Korea during the 17th to 20th centuries. Thus, the Japanese side argues that the South Koreans misunderstand the history of the name.

Surveys of antiquarian maps

To provide evidence for the date when Sea of Japan came to be used internationally, both South Korea and Japan have undertaken surveys of various historical maps.

In 2004, South Korea surveyed ancient maps archived in the British Library, the Cambridge University Library, the University of Southern California (USC) East Asian Map Collection, the U.S. Library of Congress, the National Library of Russia, and the French National Library. South Korean researchers examined 762 maps.  They found that 440 maps had used Sea of Korea (Corea), Oriental Sea/East Sea, 122 had used Sea of Japan, and 200 had used other terms. In the French language, the word orientale includes both the meaning of "eastern" related to compass direction and the meaning of "oriental", the Asiatic region. The same ambiguity is present in the Russian language, with both "eastern" and "oriental" indicated by one word.

From 2003 to 2008, Japan conducted a number of surveys of different collections. In 2010, the Ministry of Foreign Affairs (MOFA) published their conclusions; they found that among 1,332 maps from the Berlin Library, 279 used Sea of Korea, Oriental Sea, or East Sea (or some combination thereof), 579 used Sea of Japan exclusively, 47 used China Sea (with or without other names), 33 used another term, and 384 used no term. MOFA said the Struck collection (a collection of antiquarian maps owned by a European map collector) showed that out of 79 maps, 35 used Sea of Japan, 9 used the Sea of Korea, 2 used Oriental Sea, and 33 were unmarked. MOFA reported that among four Russian libraries and document archives holding 51 maps, 29 used Sea of Japan, 8 used Sea of Korea, 1 used Korea Strait, 1 used East Sea, 1 used Sea of China, and 11 used no name. MOFA said that among 1,213 maps from the U.S. Library of Congress, ones that gave a name for this body of water showed that 87 percent used Sea of Japan, 8 percent used Sea of Korea, 5 percent used other terms, and none used Oriental Sea or East Sea. Similarly, MOFA said that 58 maps from the British Library and the University of Cambridge showed 86 percent used Sea of Japan, 14 percent used Sea of Korea, and none used Oriental Sea, East Sea, or other terms. MOFA said that they looked at 1,485 maps in the French National Library. They reported that 95 percent of 215 French maps used Sea of Japan.

In November 2007, the National Geographic Information Institute of South Korea published a report on a survey of 400 ancient maps. According to the report, nine maps used East Sea for the water currently called Sea of Japan, while 31 maps used East Sea for the water currently called East China Sea. The number of maps that used Sea of Japan is not disclosed. Furthermore, the report says "In the late 18th century (1790–1830) the name Sea of Japan emerged. From the 19th century (1830 onward), there was a rapid increase in the use of the name Sea of Japan." Japan stated, "This clearly shows the fallacy of the ROK's assertion that the name Sea of Japan was the result of the Japanese policy of expansionism and colonial rule, and can be interpreted as affirming that the name Sea of Japan was in widespread use well before Japan's colonial rule over the Korean Peninsula".

Geographical arguments

Japan argues that, the name Sea of Japan has been and should be used because the marginal sea is separated from the Pacific Ocean by the Japanese Archipelago. Korea argues that the adjective "East" describes its geographical position east of the Asian continent, although it is west of Japan and south of Russia. It states that this is analogous to the North Sea, which lies north of the European continent, but west of Scandinavian countries and east of Great Britain.
However Koreans call the sea on their east side the East Sea (동해, 東海, Donghae), on their south side the South Sea (남해, 南海, Namhae), and on their west side the West Sea (서해, 西海, Seohae).

Arguments relating to ambiguity

The Japanese Hydrographic and Oceanographic Department of the Japanese Coast Guard has claimed that the name East Sea is confusing and unsuitable as an international geographic name, because the local name for a variety of seas can be translated into English as East Sea.  Examples include Dōng Hǎi (东海), the Chinese name for the East China Sea; Biển Đông, the Vietnamese name for the South China Sea; and the Baltic Sea, whose name is equivalent to East Sea in several European languages such as German (Ostsee), Swedish (Östersjön) and Finnish (Itämeri). East Sea is officially used as an English name for the body of water by the Government of Vietnam and the Government of Vietnam thusly uses East Sea for South China Sea in its English-language publications;
likewise, the Ministry of Foreign Affairs of China uses 'East Sea' for the East China Sea in its English-language publications.
Even within Japan itself the term  is already used to refer to the parts of the Pacific Ocean east of middle and upper Honshu, as can be seen in the naming of the Tōkaidō region and the Tōkai region.
The Japanese government is concerned that the name change could set a bad precedent and cause more naming disputes worldwide.

Position of international bodies
The main two international organizations which have been involved in the naming dispute are the International Hydrographic Organization and the United Nations.

International Hydrographic Organization

The International Hydrographic Organization is an organization that coordinates with member countries over hydrographic issues.  One of the organization's functions is to standardise the delineation of nautical regions.  In 1929, the organization (then called the International Hydrographic Bureau) published edition 1 of "IHO Special Publication 23" (IHO SP 23) – Limits of Oceans and Seas, which included the limits of the sea area between the Korean peninsula and Japan and the name Sea of Japan; however, at that time, Korea could not participate in the IHO because it was under Japanese rule. The name Sea of Japan remains in the current edition 3 of S-23, that was published in 1953. South Korea officially joined the IHO in 1957.

In 1974, IHO released Technical Resolution A.4.2.6. This resolution stated that:
It is recommended that where two or more countries share a given geographical feature (such as a bay, a strait, channel or archipelago) under different names, they should endeavour to reach agreement on a single name for the feature concerned. If they have different official languages and cannot agree on a common name form, it is recommended that the name forms of each of the languages in question should be accepted for charts and publications unless technical reasons prevent this practice on small scale charts.
South Korea has argued that this resolution is relevant to the debate about the Sea of Japan and implies that both names should be used; Japan, however, argues that the resolution does not apply to the Sea of Japan, because it does not specify this body of water and only applies to geographical features for which sovereignty is shared between two or more countries.

The IHO agreed to conduct a survey of available evidence in 2011. Previously, South Korea had been pushing the IHO to recommend only using the term East Sea, but announced on 2 May 2011, that it now preferred the gradual approach of using both names now, and eventually dropping the Sea of Japan name.

On 26 April 2012, after several different attempts over many years to revise the 1953 edition of S-23 – Limits of Oceans and Seas, the IHO Member States decided that it was not possible to make progress with a revision. As a result, only "Sea of Japan" continues to appear in S-23. An IHO consulting group is meant to report on the issue in 2020. In September 2020, the IHO announced that it would adopt a new numerical system, also known as "S-130". In November 2020, S-23, the previous version of the nautical chart made in 1953 will be made public as an IHO publication to demonstrate the evolutionary process from the analogue to the digital era. The IHO approved the proposal of the new official nautical chart. The new chart will be marked with a numerical identifier without a name.

United Nations
While the United Nations has never directly addressed the issue of establishing an official, standardized name for the sea, several resolutions and statements by the UN have had relevance to the topic. Japan joined the United Nations in 1956, while South and North Korea both joined in 1991.

In 1977, the Third U.N. Conference on the Standardization of Geographical Names (UNCSGN) adopted Resolution III/20, entitled "Names of Features beyond a Single Sovereignty". The resolution recommended that "when countries sharing a given geographical feature do not agree on a common name, it should be a general rule of cartography that the name used by each of the countries concerned will be accepted. A policy of accepting only one or some of such names while excluding the rest would be inconsistent as well as inexpedient in practice." As with IHO Technical Resolution A.4.2.6, South Korea and Japan disagree about whether or not this policy applies to the Sea of Japan.

In 1992, during the 1992 Sixth UNCSGN, the South Korean government, in their first time participating in the UNCSGN, requested that the name of the sea be determined through consultation, which the North Korean representative concurred with. The Japanese representative stated that the name of the Sea of Japan had already been accepted worldwide and that any change would introduce confusion. The conference recommended that the parties work together on the issue outside of the conference.

In 1998, South Korea raised the issue again at the Seventh UNCSGN. Japan, however, opposed the method by which the South Korean government proposed the issue, arguing that they had not followed the proper procedure for doing so. Following some debate, South Korea withdrew the issue, and instead recommended that the United Nations Group of Experts on Geographical Names work so that a resolution could be submitted to the Eighth UNSCGN conference. The president of the conference urged that Japan, South Korea, and North Korea work towards a mutually acceptable agreement.

At the Eighth UNCSGN in 2002, South Korea and Japan presented a number of papers to the conference regarding their positions on the naming issue. South Korea asked for a resolution to adjudicate the name, while Japan asked that the name be decided through resolution outside of the conference. No resolution was passed, and the Committee again urged the countries to develop a mutually agreeable solution. The chairman further noted that standardization could only occur after consensus had been reached. The same situation occurred at the Ninth Conference in 2007. South Korea and North Korea both proposed a resolution by the UNCSGN, while Japan expressed a desire to settle the matter outside of the conference, and the Committee urged the members to seek a mutual agreement.

On 23 April 2004, the United Nations affirmed in a written document to the Japanese government that it will continue using the name Sea of Japan in its official documents. However, it agreed to leave the topic open for further discussion. In a letter to South Korea, it was explained that the UN was not determining the validity of either name, but wished to use the term most widely used until the parties resolved the disagreement. The letter further stated, "The use of an appellation by the Secretariat based on the practice is without prejudice to any negotiations or agreements between the interested parties and should not be interpreted as advocating or endorsing any party's position, and can in no way be invoked by any party in support of a particular position in the matter."

On 6 August 2012, representatives from North and South Korea addressed an assembly at the United Nations Conference on the Standardization of Geographical Names, asking that the names "East Sea" and "Sea of Japan" be used concurrently for the sea. Ferjan Ormeling Jr., chairman of the conference, responded that the organization had no authority to decide the issue and requested that the involved countries resolve the differences over the name amongst themselves.

Other countries
Russia calls this sea "Япо́нское мо́ре" (Yapónskoye móre, Japanese Sea). Japan believes that Russia played a major role in establishing this name internationally, as mentioned above. Chinese government websites exclusively use the name 日本海 (rìběnhǎi, 'Japan Sea').
In 2003, the French Defense Ministry issued nautical maps that included both terms Sea of Japan and East Sea. It reverted to Sea of Japan as a single name in the map issued in 2004. The United Kingdom and Germany officially use the Sea of Japan.

The United States Board on Geographic Names (BGN) continues to advocate the use of Sea of Japan without qualification in U.S. government publications.  The World Factbook published by the Central Intelligence Agency follows the BGN's guidance. On 8 August 2011, a spokesman for the United States Department of State stated that the United States Board on Geographic Names considered the official name of the sea to be "Sea of Japan".  According to Yonhap, the U.S. has officially recommended to the IHO that "Sea of Japan" remain as the official name for the sea. In response to this failure of the South Korean campaign, South Korean foreign minister Kim Sung-hwan suggested advocating other historical names, such as "Sea of Korea".

In 2011, Virginia state lawmaker David W. Marsden, acting on behalf of Korean-American voters, introduced a bill to the education panel of the Senate of Virginia that would have required public school textbooks to include both "Sea of Japan" and "East Sea" as names. The panel rejected the bill by an 8–7 vote on 26 January 2012. The issue was revisited two years later on 3 February 2014, with the Education Committee of the Virginia House of Delegates passing legislation to use both "Sea of Japan" and "East Sea" in school textbooks.

On 29 June 2012, Assistant Secretary of State for East Asian and Pacific Affairs Kurt M. Campbell affirmed the BGN's position in his response, published on the White House website, to a We the People petition concerning the usage of "Sea of Japan", in which he stated, "It is longstanding United States policy to refer to each sea or ocean by a single name. This policy applies to all seas, including those bordered by multiple countries that may each have their own names for such bodies of water. Concerning the body of water between the Japanese archipelago and the Korean peninsula, longstanding U.S. policy is to refer to it as the "Sea of Japan". He also stated, "We are aware the Republic of Korea refers to the body of water as the 'East Sea,' and the United States is not asking the Republic of Korea to change its nomenclature. U.S. usage of the 'Sea of Japan' in no way implies an opinion regarding any issue related to sovereignty."

Compromise names
On 18 November 2006, during the APEC summit in Hanoi, South Korean President Roh Moo-hyun informally proposed to the Japanese Prime Minister Shinzō Abe that the sea be called instead the "Sea of Peace" or "Sea of Friendship", which Abe rejected. In January 2007 Japanese Chief Cabinet Secretary Yasuhisa Shiozaki opposed the idea, saying that there was no need to change the name of the Sea of Japan.

Response of media and publishers

A number of maps, encyclopedias, and other publications have switched to using both names. For example, the Manual of Style of the National Geographic Society states that disputed place-names in international waters or jointly controlled by two or more countries should use the conventional name first with other names following in parentheses. As such, their policy on this sea states that "The internationally accepted name is Sea of Japan, although Korea prefers East Sea. When scale permits, Geographic maps show the alternative name East Sea in parentheses after Sea of Japan."

In 2006, Google put both names on Google Earth, using East Sea near the Korean coast and Sea of Japan near the Japanese coast. In the 2007 edition of Encyclopædia Britannica, the primary article is called "Sea of Japan". A secondary article called "East Sea" notes "see Japan, Sea of". On the encyclopedia's map of Japan and other Asia maps, Sea of Japan appears as the primary label and East Sea appears as a secondary label in parentheses. However, on the map of Korea the name East Sea appears as the primary label and Sea of Japan appears as a secondary label in parentheses. Other examples of publishers who use similar systems include Microsoft Encarta, the Columbia Electronic Encyclopedia, and About.com.

In 2012, French encyclopedia publisher Larousse replaced "Mer du Japon" ("Sea of Japan") with "Mer de L'est (Mer du Japon)" ("East Sea (Sea of Japan)") in maps of South Korea and North Korea in two of its books. However, other maps, such as those of Asia, China, Japan, and Russia, continue to use "Mer du Japon". Furthermore, the article "Mer du Japon" does not mention "East Sea" at all.

In 2013, Bandai Namco Games, a Japanese game developer, initially presented both names as "Sea of Japan (East Sea)" in Ace Combat Infinity. There was intense backlash from the Japanese community for including the Korean name at all. In response, the company removed all international borders and labels from the game's maps and heavily blurred them to maintain neutrality.

See also
Anti-Japanese sentiment in Korea
Anti-Korean sentiment in Japan
Japanese-Korean disputes
Geographical renaming
Persian Gulf naming dispute

References

External links

Japan
 	

South Korea

Naming dispute
Japan–Korea relations
Japan–South Korea border
Geography of Japan
Geography of North Korea
Geography of South Korea
Geographical naming disputes
Anti-Japanese sentiment in Korea
Anti-Korean sentiment in Japan

fr:Mer du Japon#Appellation